The effects of Hurricane Mitch in Honduras were destructive and deadly, resulting in the most significant flooding in Honduras in the 20th century. Hurricane Mitch, the strongest storm of the 1998 Atlantic hurricane season, formed on October 22, and after becoming a Category 5 hurricane, it weakened and struck Honduras on October 29. While near peak intensity, Mitch struck the offshore Guanaja island, where it nearly destroyed the mangrove forest. On the mainland, the hurricane dropped torrential rainfall, and many gauges were washed away in mountainous areas where unofficial rainfall totals were as high as 1900 mm (75 in). The rains caused widespread flooding and landslides, although impact from winds was not as severe.

The President of Honduras estimated that Mitch set back 50 years of economic development. The storm wrecked about 35,000 houses and damaged another 50,000, leaving up to 1.5 million people homeless, or about 20% of the country's population. Mitch directly caused $2.005 billion in damage, with an additional $1.8 billion in indirect costs. Most of the damage was ruined crops, and cash crop exports were cut by 9.4% in 1999, largely due to the storm. Over 70% of the transportation infrastructure was damaged, mostly damaged highways and bridges. Widespread areas experienced power outages, and about 70% of the country lost water after the storm. In the capital, Tegucigalpa, a large landslide affected three neighborhoods and formed a temporary dam. Floods in the city damaged buildings that were over 350 years old. Throughout the country, there were at least 7,000 fatalities, some reported in each department.

Following the storm, officials in Honduras requested international assistance, which totaled $2.8 billion over a several-year period. Despite this, the gross domestic product began decreasing at the end of 1998, and contracted by 1.9% in 1999. Officials enacted a widespread curfew following the storm, and for 15 days temporarily restricted constitutional rights to maintain order. There were outbreaks in various diseases, and many residents faced food and water shortages. Due to the heavy damage, the name Mitch was retired from the Atlantic hurricane naming list.

Preparations and background

Hurricane Mitch formed on October 22 in the southwestern Caribbean Sea, and it eventually intensified into a Category 5 on the Saffir-Simpson Hurricane Scale by October 26. By that time, the hurricane was just north of the coast of Honduras, and was expected by the National Hurricane Center (NHC) and various tropical cyclone forecast models to turn to the north. When the track was more westward than expected, the NHC recommended early on October 26 for a hurricane warning to be issued for the northeastern Honduran coast, although difficulties in communications prevented their immediate implementation. Within a few hours, a hurricane warning was in place between Limón to the Honduras and Nicaragua border, including the offshore Swan Island. When Mitch still failed to turn to the north, the government of Honduras issued a hurricane warning for the remainder of their coastline. The hurricane weakened while turning to the south, and made landfall in Honduras 134 km (83 mi) east of La Ceiba, with estimated winds of 130 km/h (80 mph). Mitch continued to weaken while moving slowly westward across the country.

On October 26, the Honduran Permanent Contingency Commission coordinated with neighboring countries regarding the storm. Officials initially issued a state of emergency for the offshore islands and five coastal departments, which was later extended to the rest of the country. The government increased emergency spending and created a National Emergency Commission. Officials advised residents to evacuate in flood-prone areas, although many people stayed for fear of being looted. Some left to stay with relatives during the hurricane. Prisoners in Tegucigalpa Central Penitentiary were evacuated to the national stadium.

Before the storm struck, Honduras was facing decreased food supplies due to ongoing El Niño conditions. The economy had been growing at a rate similar to the previous year until Mitch struck, and was largely dependent on exports. About 73% of the population was living in poverty when the storm struck. Hurricane Mitch set back the economies of various countries in the region, including Honduras, Nicaragua, Guatemala, and El Salvador, after they had improved throughout the 1990s.

Meteorological effects

Due to weak steering currents, Hurricane Mitch moved slowly for about a week, both offshore and while moving through Honduras. In some areas, high mountain peaks contributed to high precipitation totals, and the highest amounts occurred in southern Honduras. At Universidad Nacional Autónoma de Honduras in the capital Tegucigalpa, rainfall totaled 294 mm (11.58 in). At La Ceiba near where the storm made landfall, Mitch produced  of rainfall, which is 30% of its annual rainfall; of the total,  fell on October 27, which was the third highest amount there on record. There were unofficial rainfall totals in Central America as high as 1900 mm (75 in); rain gauges in mountainous areas were washed away.

The high rainfall caused many rivers in the country to overflow "to an unprecedented extent this century", as described by the United Nations. The flooding caused the Choluteca River to change its course, forming an avulsion. Flooding also affected the Pacific coast along the Gulf of Fonseca, leaving behind debris and sediment. In the country's interior, particularly the southern portion, the high rainfall caused hundreds of landslides, many of them shallow and about 95% in the form of debris flow. However, two earthflows caused significant damage near Tegucigalpa.

In mainland Honduras, the winds were not as damaging as the rainfall, although offshore islands sustained heavy damage due to high winds. Offshore northern Honduras, it was estimated that Mitch produced waves as high as 13 m (44 ft).

Impact
Overall, Hurricane Mitch caused an estimated $3.8 billion in damage, of which $2.005 billion was from direct damages and the remainder from indirect costs. The overall impact represented about 70% of Honduras's annual gross domestic product (GDP).

Offshore
On October 27, the S/V Fantome, a schooner, last reported its location to the south of Guanaja, while trying to escape the brunt of the storm. The United States Coast Guard searched until November 4, when they observed the debris from the ship. All 31 people on board were presumed killed.

On the offshore Guanaja island, waters rose about  during the storm. The combination of storm surge and high winds severely damaged offshore islands. High waves eroded northern coastlines and damaged lagoons. Most of the Bay Islands had damage to their water facilities. Two days of winds exceeding  destroyed nearly all of the plants and trees on Guanaja, uprooting or knocking down almost the entire mangrove forest. Those remaining standing were damaged internally and unable to regrow. All trees lost their leaves on the island, and 70% of conifer trees were knocked down. Montane trees likewise experienced severe damage, although they made a recovery within a year. However, no mangrove trees had regrown there by three years after the storm struck, indicating the level of destruction. Tree damage also occurred on nearby Roatán island, although to a much lesser degree, and occurring on the eastern end. Winds there were generally less than 185 km/h (115 mph), and the tree damage was more random.

Mainland

Hurricane Mitch wrought significant damage to Honduras, affecting nearly the entire population and causing damage in all 18 departments. High winds near the coast knocked down trees, particularly in mountainous areas. The United Nations Economic Commission for Latin America and the Caribbean estimated that Mitch caused the worst floods of the 20th century in the country. Severe flooding occurred in the northern region, which washed away more than 25 entire villages. In San Pedro Sula in northwestern Honduras, flooding covered several neighborhoods and the international airport. Near the coast, high waves destroyed hotels and houses while swollen rivers flooded nearby areas. Damage was heaviest in Colón and Atlántida departments. In the latter department, the Cangrejal River left heavy damage along its path after it flooded. In Choluteca and Valle departments in the southern portion of the country, river flooding swept away houses and affected neighborhoods.

An estimated 70–80% of the transportation network was destroyed, including most bridges and secondary roads, amounting to $236 million in damage. In mountainous areas, floods carrying debris damaged roads and bridges. Several vehicles were washed away due to the floods. In contrast to roads, there was little railway damage. There was minor impact to the nation's airports, limited to some damage to air traffic equipment. Seaports also sustained minor damage, although many lost electronic equipment. About 11% of Honduras's telephone lines were damaged during the storm. Landslides and flooding contaminated aqueducts in several cities, including 1,600 systems in rural areas. Many cities sustained damage to their water network, and about 70% of Honduras lost access to fresh water after the storm, although many rural areas had already been experiencing water shortages. The combined damage to transportation, communication, utilities, including power and water, was estimated at $665 million. Communications were disrupted after power outages, and there were also fuel and water shortages. Flooding damaged or destroyed industrial areas of Honduras, which affected exports and domestic products. Six maquiladora factories were damaged in the northern portion of the country, and one was destroyed in La Ceiba. Many businesses shut down, leaving many people unemployed who already lost their homes. Mitch also destroyed 123 health facilities nationwide and wrecked 4,835, or 23%, of the nation's classrooms. As a result, most classes that would have gone until November 30 were ended about a month early, allowing teachers to assist in helping others.

Mitch largely destroyed the center of the city, including many residential buildings along river banks. The floods damaged about one-third of buildings, including some more than 350 years old. This landslide, the largest generated by Mitch in the country, destroyed the Colonia Soto section and damaged portions of two other neighborhoods. It carried debris, trees, and rocks, forming a temporary dam along the Choluteca River laden with sewage. Because the landslide was slow-moving, officials were able to evacuate before the river was stopped due to the temporary dam. Another smaller landslide destroyed several houses in the Colonia El Reparto section of the capital, although it was also slow-moving, and the residents were able to evacuate. Other landslides destroyed over 20 houses along the rivers in the city due to erosion along river banks.

Across Honduras, agriculture sustained serious damage, with initial estimates of 70% of crops destroyed. Flooding affected about 29% of the country's arable land, much of covered for an extended period of time. This washed away large areas of topsoil, which would take a long period of time to recover. About 85% of the banana crop was lost, along with the loss of 60% of melons, 60% of sugar cane, and 58% of corn. About one-third of the corn crop had already been harvested. About 50,000 bovine were killed, as were 60% of the fowl population. Crop and agricultural damage totaled about $1 billion, which would take the country years to recover. Poor road conditions following the storm prevented crops from being dried, which caused further damage.

Honduras's Social Fund for Housing estimated that 35,000 houses nationwide were destroyed with another 50,000 damaged, many of which were poorly built or in flood-prone areas. This left up to 1.5 million people homeless – about 20% of the total population – and was the highest number of victims from any natural disaster in Honduras's history. Over 30% of the populations of Choluteca, Colón, and Cortés departments were left homeless. Housing costs were estimated at $344 million, including $221 million in housing damage; the rest included the costs for shelters, removal of debris, and loss of rent.

Deaths and injuries
Overall, Hurricane Mitch killed about 7,000 people in Honduras, with 11,000 missing in the months after the storm. There were 8,000 people listed as missing about ten days after Mitch struck, although problems with record-keeping made it difficult to determine the exact total. Choluteca Department in the southern portion of the country had the most deaths, with 1,200 fatalities. Francisco Morazán Department, which includes Tegucigalpa, had about 1,000 deaths, and Yoro Department had 911 fatalities. There were deaths in every department, however. Many of the dead were buried in mass graves or were cremated. The storm injured 12,272 people nationwide, mostly in Choluteca and Cortés departments.

Aftermath

Then-president Carlos Roberto Flores estimated that Mitch reversed 50 years of progress in the country. Officials estimated it would take at least 15 years to rebuild completely. The national gross domestic product (GDP) only grew at a rate of 3% due to the storm, compared with 5.1% in 1997, due to damaged infrastructure and lingering effects. In 1999, the economy of Honduras contracted by 1.9%, largely due to the storm. The Honduran government increased spending by 24.7%,. much of it emergency funds to restore communications and provide relief, which caused economic deficits. This caused inflation to increase from 13.6% to 15.7%. The Honduran government adjusted its economic plan, including privatization of various federal entities. For two years, the government temporarily halted taxes to businesses affected by the hurricane.

In the storm's immediate aftermath, officials enacted a widespread curfew after reports of looting and vandalism. The government temporarily restricted constitutional rights for 15 days. Officials urged residents to restrict water and fuel use, and alcohol sales were halted. The widespread flooding and the crippled infrastructure forced officials to rely on a limited number of helicopters to operate search and rescue missions and deliver supplies. A helicopter carrying four people, including Tegucigalpa mayor and potential presidential candidate César Castellanos, crashed on November 1 while touring flood damage, killing everyone aboard. In some areas, residents did not receive assistance until November 12, more than two weeks after Mitch's landfall. About 285,000 people remained in 1,375 shelters, many of them schools, by three weeks after the hurricane struck. Some sports stadiums and churches were also used as makeshift shelters. Overcrowding at shelters caused various diseases.

Due to the hurricane and the widespread destruction, the hurricane caused outbreaks of malaria, dengue, cholera, and various fever and respiratory illnesses. Ongoing flooding caused an outbreak of Leptospirosis, notably in Cortés Department. There were widespread food and water shortages, leaving villagers near-starvation. Damaged crops also prevented the export of cash crops, and exports decreased by 9.4% in 1999. Many of the people left homeless also became unemployed, and there were reductions in exports and economic growth. Officials set up shelters that housed 285,000 people for about a month. In Tegucigalpa, where the Choluteca River was dammed by a landslide, a temporary lagoon filled with sewage persisted for about two months, until a crew from the United States Army Corps of Engineers and United States Geological Survey dug a channel to drain the water.

Even before the storm struck, the government of Honduras issued an appeal for international assistance. In the immediate aftermath, the United States provided $875,000 in aid. A portion went to purchasing and delivering food, while the majority used airplanes to participate in rescue missions and deliver supplies, such as plastic sheets and water. The United States ultimately gave $15 million in aid to Honduras through various United Nations organizations. Mexico donated food, medicine, and clothing, and Cuba sent a team of doctors and mobile hospitals. Uruguay donated a pump for the city of Choluteca to restore water there. Several European Countries sent aid to Honduras, in addition to donations from the European Union. France sent medical equipment, and the government of Japan provided a field hospital that helped 300 patients per day in the center of Tegucigalpa. Following the storm, the United Nations Development Programme sent a team to Honduras and El Salvador to determine the needs of the population. The Honduran government requested the team to assess the socio-economic impact of the storm. The World Food Programme provided $17 million worth of food to the country. The Pan American Health Organization focused on restoring water systems by providing latrines, while UNICEF sent large water tanks.

The Inter-American Development Bank approved $197.4 million in loans in 1998, most of which due to Hurricane Mitch. The loans were to assist in rebuilding damaged infrastructure, including for water systems, transportation, and houses. Various countries provided nearly $2.8 billion to the country in aid, which limited the annual debt following the hurricane's damage. The foreign aid due to the storm largely ended by 2003.

Overall cost for reconstruction was estimated at $2.5 billion, which was estimated to take four years. The cost for repairing the damaged houses was estimated at $484.8 million. Following the storm, workers made emergency repairs to the destroyed bridges and roads. The cost for rebuilding roads was higher than their damage cost due to planning for future flooding. Within a month, there were repairs to the power grid to a level of 550 MW, or 91.7% of what it was before Mitch struck. Water companies restored water to 60% of Tegucigalpa within a month of the storm striking.

The Honduras delegation to the World Meteorological Organization requested the name "Mitch" be retired, following the hurricane. The 25 member committee voted in support to replace the name with "Matthew", which was first used in 2004. That name was later retired following its usage in 2016 due to the devastation it caused in Haiti in early October of that year, and was subsequently replaced by "Martin".

Refugee crisis 
Millions of Hondurans were left homeless as a result of Mitch, and the most substantial reconstruction efforts took place in Honduras and neighboring Nicaragua. Hundreds of refugee centers each holding thousands of displaced Hondurans were set up in cities. However, many of these centers were ineffective at providing food and resources. Part of this was due to confusion between the government, churches, and local commerce groups over how supplies were to be allocated and distributed. There were significant resources intended for refugees, but authorities often hoarded it in heavily-guarded warehouses. The entire hurricane and subsequent refugee crisis did bring to light the problems Hondurans faced relating to contagious diseases, and the country received considerable medical attention in the aftermath of Mitch.

Rural regions 
While those in cities had at least some form of access to relief supplies, Honduras’ rural population, which makes up most of the country, was almost completely annihilated. The damage caused by winds and flooding combined with most of those affected living in poverty meant most, if not all, buildings were destroyed, roads were wiped out, and communication systems collapsed. Because of the region's low human development and a high poverty rate of about 75 percent, rural areas received very little aid compared to those in more urban areas. The urban areas were able to rebuild much faster while the rest of the country languished. In these regions, the effects of Mitch are still very prevalent in the modern day. Thousands lack clean water and shelter, little infrastructure has been rebuilt, and diseases are widespread due to the lack of proper hygiene facilities. Today, the Honduran government provides very little in terms of support, with most of the international community doing the same. However, some humanitarian aid groups continue to visit Honduras to help those still affected by constructing new homes, hospitals, and orphanages, installing water filtration systems and latrines, and providing medical and dental care.

Mitch caused substantial damage to the nation's agricultural industry, particularly in areas inhabited by mestizos and indigenous groups. Bananas, plantains, and manioc, all of which are historically important export crops for Honduras, were all essentially destroyed, as were about 80% of rice farms. The destruction of crops also led to malnourishment and starvation for Hondurans, worsening the already existing problems related to disease.

Indigenous Groups 
Despite the catastrophic losses, Mitch may have actually benefited some rural populations because it forced a change in how groups use their land. A research study conducted between 1994 and 2002 (Mitch occurred in 1998) analyzed land use among rural indigenous populations before and after Mitch. Traditionally, experts believed that poor rural populations, who are almost entirely dependent on the resources of the land they live on, need major assistance to survive catastrophic natural disasters. However, some speculated that these populations can use a disaster such as Hurricane Mitch as a window of opportunity to actually make systematic improvements to their environment.

Researchers studied land occupied by the Tawahka, an indigenous group in northeastern Honduras that was impacted just as much as other non-indigenous communities. This community lies on the Patuca River where rice, manioc, cacao, and various fruits were farmed. When Mitch struck, all of the crops grown by the Tawahka were ruined as households who owned the least amount of land were hit the hardest. Additionally, the study outlined three factors that made the Tawahka settlement particularly vulnerable to Mitch:

 Market specialization-cacao crops were the community’s most successful, but they were all concentrated on a particular piece of land along the Patuca River susceptible to flooding.
 Land concentration-the land and wealth was primarily controlled by a select few households, meaning those with less land were almost certainly guaranteed to lose all they had.
 Forest conservation-The Honduran government pressured the Tawahka to give up some of their lands, which in turn forced the Tawahka to rely on more cacao.

At the conclusion of the study in 2002, the researchers found that the Tawahka were actually in a much better place than they were before Mitch hit. Institutional changes had been made to improve farming efficiency and individual well-being, as well as how the community would react to future natural disasters. Land became more equitably distributed among all members of the community. Nearby forests were cleared, allowing for more agricultural space to grow a wider variety of crops. Income for households dropped slightly, but was now more diversified than before. Ultimately, these changes proved effective in 2008 when severe storms caused flooding similar to Mitch, the negative impacts to farming and infrastructure were practically nothing compared to a decade earlier.

See also
Hurricane Fifi – deadly hurricane in Honduras in 1974 that killed thousands

Notes

References

Mitch
Mitch Effects
Hurricane Mitch
Mitch